Mounia Bennani-Chraïbi is a Moroccan political scientist, author and professor at the University of Lausanne. She published several works on activism, social media, youth issues and elections.

Biography 
Mounia attended Paris Institute of Political Studies, where she earned her PhD in political science in 1993.

Between 2002 and 2004, Mounia was the director of Diploma of Higher Specialized Studies (DESS in France) on "Arab world, contemporary Muslim world".

She completed her habilitation at Université Paris Sciences et Lettres (PSL) in 2019.

Books 
Bennani-Chraïbi is the author of the book Soumis et rebelles: les jeunes au Maroc (1994).

She is also a co-editor of multiple edited volumes including:
Résistances et protestations dans les sociétés musulmanes (edited with Olivier Fillieule, 2003)
Scènes et coulisses de l'élection au Maroc: les législatives 2002 (edited with Myriam Catusse and Jean-Claude Santucci, 2005)
Jeunesses des sociétés arabes: par-delà les promesses et les menaces (edited with Iman Farag, 2007)
Partis politiques et protestations au Maroc (1934-2020) (2021)

References 

Living people
Year of birth missing (living people)
Moroccan political scientists
Women political scientists
Academic staff of the University of Lausanne
Sciences Po alumni
Moroccan expatriates in France